Phoenix Finance (otherwise known as DART Grand Prix) was a British banking company which attempted to enter the 2002 and 2003 Formula One seasons. Charles Nickerson was Managing Director of the company.

Takeover from Prost 
Phoenix Finance bought some of the remains of Prost Grand Prix, outbidding Paul Stoddart of Minardi, shortly before the 2002 Australian Grand Prix. The team hoped to enter Formula One at the next round, the Malaysian Grand Prix. The team planned to use the 2001-spec Prost AP04 chassis with Hart designed Arrows V10 engines from 1998. Tom Walkinshaw boss of the Arrows team had planned to give the new team assistance. Craig Pollock was rumoured to be the new team principal.

However their entry to the championship instantly hit problems as to whether Phoenix were Prost under a new name or a new team with some of Prost's old assets. Their entry was rejected by the Fédération Internationale de l'Automobile (FIA) because the team did not buy Prost Grand Prix completely, thus making them a new team. As they were a new team, they were required to pay a $48 Million fee to the FIA in order to enter F1. As they had not done that, they were refused entry into the sport. F1 supremo Bernie Ecclestone claimed of Charles Nickerson at the time that "He has bought nothing in Formula One. All he has bought is some show-off cars". Phoenix also claimed that along with several other assets, they had also bought the Prost entry into Formula One, which in their view, meant that they did not have to pay the $48 Million fee to the FIA. The FIA later rejected this claim and ruled that team entries could not be bought or sold.

Phoenix did appear at Sepang for the 2002 Malaysian Grand Prix. They had the former Minardi drivers, Tarso Marques and Gastón Mazzacane, who had also driven for Prost in 2001. Appearing in Malaysia with engineers, two Prost cars and their two drivers they planned to race but were barred by officials. The team even went as far as taking the FIA to the High Court, but the court backed the FIA's ruling that team entries could not be bought or sold.

Phoenix AP04B 
The car was named the Phoenix AP04B. The cars appeared to be painted blue with no sponsor colours or logos. The tyre supplier was rumored to be Bridgestone, Michelin or Avon.

References

Formula One entrants
Formula One constructors